Pettin’ in the Park is a 1934 Warner Bros. Merrie Melodies cartoon directed by Bernard Brown. The short was released on January 27, 1934.

Overview
The cartoon begins with the song "Pettin' in the Park", from the 1933 film Gold Diggers of 1933. The first part of the cartoon has to do with the song itself, and someone loving another person of the opposite sex. The second part has to do with different birds in a swimming contest in the public park pond.

References

External links

1934 films
1934 animated films
1934 comedy films
1934 directorial debut films
1930s romance films
American black-and-white films
Films scored by Norman Spencer (composer)
Films directed by Bernard B. Brown
Merrie Melodies short films
Warner Bros. Cartoons animated short films
1930s Warner Bros. animated short films
1930s English-language films